Magnolia glauca can refer to:

Magnolia glauca (Korth.) Pierre, a synonym of Magnolia elegans (Blume) H.Keng
Magnolia glauca (L.) L., a synonym of Magnolia virginiana L. subsp. virginiana
Magnolia glauca  Thunb., a synonym of Magnolia obovata Thunb.